1993 census may refer to:

 1993 North Korea Census
 1993 Peru Census